The MTV Europe Music Awards 2009 took place in Berlin, Germany at the O2 World and Brandenburg Gate on 5 November 2009. The awards ceremony was presented by Katy Perry for a 2nd consecutive year. It was the fourth time that the MTV Europe Music Awards were hosted in Germany and the second time that they were hosted in Berlin, since the inaugural edition of the MTV Europe Music Awards also took place there. Thus Berlin became the first city to host the event twice.

Nominations for regional awards were announced on 1 September 2009, followed by those of the main awards on September 21, 2009. Pete Wentz was the host for the 2009 MTV Europe Music Awards webcast.

Though the MTV EMAs have traditionally been advertised as Europe's premiere music event, few European artists received nominations in key categories.

The 2009 MTV Europe Music Awards logo and promos were designed in-house by MTV World Design Studio in Milan and Buenos Aires with additional input by Swedish graphic design company Kungen & Hertigen.

Nominations 
Winners are in bold text.

Regional nominations 
Winners are in bold text.

Performances 
Green Day — "Know Your Enemy" / "Minority"
Katy Perry — "I Gotta Feeling" / "When Love Takes Over" / "Use Somebody" / "Halo" / "Poker Face"
Beyoncé — "Sweet Dreams"
Jay-Z and Bridget Kelly — "Empire State of Mind"
Foo Fighters — "Wheels" / "All My Life"
U2 — "One" / "Magnificent"
Shakira — "Did It Again"
Tokio Hotel  — "World Behind My Wall"
Leona Lewis — "Happy"
U2 and Jay-Z — "Sunday Bloody Sunday"

Appearances
Pete Wentz and Bar Refaeli — presented Best Live Act
Joss Stone and Wladimir Klitschko — presented Best Urban
David Hasselhoff — presented Best Rock
Dave Bautista — presented Best Song
Juliette Lewis and Gillian Deegan — presented Best Alternative
Lil' Kim — presented Best New Act
Jean Reno — presented Best Male
Jonas Brothers — introduced the Michael Jackson tribute
Joko Winterscheidt and Matthias Schweighöfer — presented Best German Act
Backstreet Boys — presented Best European Act
Jesse Metcalfe — presented Best Group
David Guetta and Asia Argento — presented Best Female
Miranda Cosgrove and Brody Jenner — presented Best Video

See also
2009 MTV Video Music Awards

References

External links
MTV Europe Music Awards Official show site
The Show

2009
2009 music awards
Music in Berlin
2009 in Germany
2009 in German music
2009 in Berlin
November 2009 events in Europe